Lawrence Svobida (June 15, 1908 – August 3, 1984) was an American farmer during the Dust Bowl and Great Depression and American writer. He is known for his work Farming the Dust Bowl: A First-Hand Account from Kansas, which was published in 1940, in which he details his experiences as a farmer in Oklahoma, Kansas, and the Great Plains region from 1929 to 1939. He was married to Agnes Svobida (October 20, 1913 - March 26, 1991). He also wrote An Empire of Dust about the Dust Bowl. He is buried in Pleasant Grove Cemetery in Cove, Polk County, Arkansas.

References

1908 births
1984 deaths
American writers